"Hiding All the Stars" is a song by British electronic dance music artist Chicane featuring vocals by Natasha Andrews.  The song, which samples "Cars" by Gary Numan, was released on 18 October 2009 in the United Kingdom.

"Hiding All the Stars" entered the UK Singles Chart on 25 October 2009 at number forty-two. It dropped to number ninety-eight by the second
week. The song peaked at number twenty-three in Belgium (Flanders).

Track listing
 UK digital download
 "Hiding All the Stars" (Radio Edit) – 3:30
 "Hiding All the Stars" (Club Mix) – 07:41
 "Hiding All the Stars" (Justin Fry Remix) – 05:53

 Dutch digital download
 "Hiding All the Stars" (Radio Edit) - 03:03
 "Hiding All the Stars" (Club Mix) - 07:41
 "Hiding All the Stars" (Michael Woods Remix) - 07:08
 "Hiding All the Stars" (Justin Fry Remix) - 05:53

Charts

Release history

References

2009 songs
2009 singles
Chicane (musician) songs
Songs written by Gary Numan